Darkhan is a craftsman or an honorary privilege in the Mongolian language. It also refers to a common Mongolian place name, specifically the following places.

Mongolia
 Darkhan-Uul Province, an aimag (province)
 Darkhan (city), the capital of Darkhan-Uul Province
 Darkhan, Khentii, a sum (district) of the Khentii aimag

China
 Darhan Muminggan United Banner, a county level division of Baotou City, Inner Mongolia
 Horqin Left Middle Banner, also known as Darhan Banner